Latergaz may refer to:
 Latergaz-e Olya
 Latergaz-e Sofla